The LV legislative period of the Chilean Congress was elected in the 2017 Chilean general election and sat until 2022.

Members

Senate

List of members

Notes

References 

Legislative periods of Chile